Hrachya Kochar (19 January 1910 – 2 May 1965), born Hrachya Kochari Gabrielyan, was an Armenian writer and publicist. He won the first state prize of the Armenian SSR for his novella Nahapet, which was adapted into a film of the same name in 1977.

Biography 
Hrachya Gabrielyan was born in 1910 in the Ottoman Empire, in the village of Kumlubucak (now located in the Taşlıçay district of the Ağrı Province of Turkey), historically located in the province of Bagrevand in Western Armenia. He lost both of his parents the Armenian genocide: his mother died during their flight to Eastern Armenia, while his father, Kochar, also known as Kocho, who fought in Andranik's army, died in 1918. Hrachya Kochar chose his pseudonym in honor of his father. Along with other people from his village, Hrachya managed to escape the massacres and reach Eastern Armenia. He worked as a shepherd and as a pitman in the mines of Alaverdi. He then moved to Yerevan and was accepted to the faculty of philology of Yerevan State University.

He published his first story, titled "Khaje", in 1931 in the monthly Nor Ughi. In 1934, he edited the Kurdish-language newspaper Ria Taza. He became a member of the Union of Soviet Writers in 1934 and of the Communist Party in 1939. In 1939, he was penalized by the party and left unemployed, until Martiros Saryan found him work in the Committee for the Preservation of Historical Monuments. Kochar traveled around Armenian to investigate the state of Armenian monasteries and chapels, summarizing his findings in the "Album-Guidebook of the Goris and Sisian regions".

From 1941 to 1945, Kochar served in the Red Army and participated in World War II. Kochar's writings from the front were published in a series of collections, starting with Herosneri tsnunde ("The Birth of Heroes") in 1942. One of his short stories written during the war, "The General's Sister", was published in Pravda in 1945 and later translated into 24 languages. In the last years, he has printed the "White Book", where "The Nahapet", "The Yearning" and "Euphrate's Bridge" are the best novels of the writer.

From 1946 to 1951, he was the secretary of the Writers Union of Armenia and the editor of the monthly Sovetakan Grakanutyun ("Soviet Literature"). In 1954 he edited the satirical magazine Vozni. Kochar wrote the script for the film Hyusisayin Tsiatsan ("Northern Rainbow", Hayfilm, 1961). His works have been translated into Russian and other languages. He died in Yerevan in 1965.

Prizes 
Order of the Red Star
 State Prize of Armenian SSR for "The Nahabed" novel

Sources 

 

Armenian male writers
1910 births
1965 deaths
Soviet male writers
20th-century Armenian writers
Yerevan State University alumni
20th-century male writers